The 1902 Kansas gubernatorial election was held on November 4, 1902. Republican nominee Willis J. Bailey defeated Democratic nominee W. H. Craddock with 55.45% of the vote.

General election

Candidates
Major party candidates 
Willis J. Bailey, Republican
W. H. Craddock, Democratic

Other candidates
F. W. Emerson, Prohibition
A. S. McAllister, Socialist
James H. Lathrop, People's

Results

References

1902
Kansas
Gubernatorial